Cameron of the Royal Mounted is a 1921 Canadian silent action film directed by Henry MacRae and starring Gaston Glass, Irving Cummings and Vivienne Osborne. Part of the tradition of Northerns, it is based on the story Corporal Cameron by Ralph Connor about a young Scottish immigrant who joins the Mounties.

Cast
 Gaston Glass as Cpl. Cameron
 Irving Cummings as Dick Raven
 Vivienne Osborne as Mandy Haley
 Frank Lanning as Little Thunder
 George Larkin as Andre Potts
 Joseph Singleton as Jim Haley
 Marion McDonald as Mrs. Haley
 Gordon Griffith

References

Bibliography
 Langman, Larry. A Guide to Silent Westerns. Greenwood Publishing Group, 1992.

External links
 

1921 films
1920s action drama films
Canadian silent films
Canadian action drama films
Canadian black-and-white films
Films distributed by W. W. Hodkinson Corporation
Films directed by Henry MacRae
1920s English-language films
1920s Canadian films
Silent action drama films